Nuoragana (Nuorağana) is a rural locality (a selo), the only inhabited locality, and the administrative center of Zhabylsky Rural Okrug of Megino-Kangalassky District in the Sakha Republic, Russia, located  from Mayya, the administrative center of the district. Its population as of the 2010 Census was 718, down from 773 recorded during the 2002 Census.

References

Notes

Sources
Official website of the Sakha Republic. Registry of the Administrative-Territorial Divisions of the Sakha Republic. Megino-Kangalassky District. 

Rural localities in Megino-Kangalassky District